The 2018 Northern Mariana gubernatorial election took place on Tuesday, November 13, 2018, to elect the Governor of the Northern Mariana Islands and the Lieutenant Governor of the Northern Mariana Islands to a four-year term in office. Incumbent Republican governor Ralph Torres, who ascended to governorship in December 2015 following the death of Governor Eloy Inos, sought election to a full term.

The election, which corresponds to the larger Northern Mariana general election and the United States midterms, was originally scheduled to be held on Tuesday, November 6, 2018. However, Governor Ralph Torres postponed all elections in the territory until November 13 due to the impact of Typhoon Yutu, which struck the Northern Mariana Islands as a Category 5 storm in October 2018, shortly before the planned elections.

Unlike past gubernatorial elections, there was no runoff election in 2018, since there are only two candidates contesting the gubernatorial contest, incumbent Ralph Torres and former governor Juan Babauta. On November 13, 2018, Governor Torres won his first full term as Governor of the Northern Mariana Islands.

Election background
In the 2014 gubernatorial race, Republican governor Eloy Inos and his running mate, Ralph Torres, were elected to a full four-year term. The Inos-Torres ticket defeated independent candidate, Heinz Hofschneider, in the gubernatorial runoff on November 18, 2014.

Governor Eloy Inos died in office at a hospital in Seattle, Washington, on Monday, December 28, 2015 (local time in Seattle). Because of the time difference between Seattle, it was already Tuesday morning, December 29, in the Northern Mariana Islands at the time of Governor Inos' death. Lieutenant Governor Ralph Torres became the new Governor of the Northern Mariana Islands on Tuesday, December 29, to serve the remainder of Inos' unexpired term. Victor Hocog, the then-President of the Northern Mariana Islands Senate, was sworn in as the new Lieutenant Governor later that day on December 29.

On November 8, 2017, Lt. Governor Victor Hocog announced that he would not run for re-election as lieutenant governor in 2018. Instead, Hocog would seek election for one of the two Senate seats representing the island of Rota in the 2018 general election.

Governor Ralph Torres declared his candidacy for a full term in a press conference on November 19, 2017, at his home in As Teo. Torres chose Senate President Arnold Palacios as his new running mate for lieutenant governor in 2018 gubernatorial contest.

Juan Babauta, the former Governor from 2002 to 2006, announced his candidacy on April 12, 2018, as an independent. He selected Dr. Rita Sablan, the former commissioner of the Commonwealth of the Northern Mariana Islands Public School System, as his running mate for lieutenant governor. His candidacy was supported by territorial delegate Gregorio Sablan, an independent who caucuses with the national Democratic Party in Congress.

Election postponement

The Northern Mariana Islands' general and gubernatorial elections were originally scheduled for Tuesday, November 6, 2018, to correspond with the nationwide 2018 United States midterm elections. However, Typhoon Yutu made landfall in the Northern Mariana Islands as a Category 5 super typhoon, devastating the main islands of Saipan and Tinian. In response, Governor Torres postponed all elections in the Northern Mariana Islands until Tuesday, November 13, 2018, including the gubernatorial race.

Early voting was held from Tuesday, November 6, 2018, until Monday, November 12, 2018.

Candidates

Republican 
Ralph Torres – incumbent Governor since December 29, 2015
Running mate: Arnold Palacios - President of the Northern Mariana Islands Senate in the 20th Legislature since January 9, 2017. Palacios was announced as Torres's running mate on November 19, 2017

Independent 
Juan Babauta - former Governor (2002–2006) and 2014 gubernatorial candidate; candidacy announced on April 12, 2018
Running mate: Dr. Rita Sablan – A Democrat and former principal and two-term Education Commissioner of the Commonwealth of the Northern Mariana Islands Public School System (2009–2016)

Withdrew
Democratic 
Joe Inos - former Mayor of Rota and brother of the late Gov. Eloy Inos. Announced gubernatorial candidacy on January 19, 2018. Inos withdrew from the race on February 7, 2018, citing a lack of unified support from his family. Prior to dropping out, Inos was expected to name his running mate on February 15, 2018.

Results
The gubernatorial contest was held on Tuesday, November 13, 2018, having been delayed one week due to recovery efforts from Typhoon Yutu.  Early voting began on November 6.
Incumbent Ralph Torres won re-election to his first full term.

References

2018 Northern Mariana Islands elections
Northern Mariana Islands
2018 in the Northern Mariana Islands